The 2016 North Indian Ocean cyclone season was an event in the annual cycle of tropical cyclone formation. It was the deadliest season since 2010, killing more than 400 people. The season was an average one, seeing four named storms, with one further intensifying into a very severe cyclonic storm. The first named storm, Roanu, developed on 19 May while the season's last named storm, Vardah, dissipated on 18 December. The North Indian Ocean cyclone season has no official bounds, but cyclones tend to form between April and December, with the two peaks in May and November. These dates conventionally delimit the period of each year when most tropical cyclones form in the northern Indian Ocean.

The scope of this article is limited to the Indian Ocean in the Northern Hemisphere, east of the Horn of Africa and west of the Malay Peninsula. There are two main seas in the North Indian Ocean — the Arabian Sea to the west of the Indian subcontinent, abbreviated ARB by the India Meteorological Department (IMD); and the Bay of Bengal to the east, abbreviated BOB by the IMD. The official Regional Specialized Meteorological Centre in this basin is the India Meteorological Department (IMD), while the Joint Typhoon Warning Center releases unofficial advisories. On average, three to four cyclonic storms form in this basin every season.



Season summary

The season officially started with the formation of Cyclone Roanu over in the Bay of Bengal on 17 May. The beginning of June witnessed no storms, although many low-pressure areas formed over Bay of Bengal, but none of them intensified into a depression, due to a very strong southwest monsoon. At the end of June, Depression ARB 01 formed, but weakened within two days. July witnessed no storms until a deep depression formed in August, under the influence of an upper air cyclonic circulation over Gangetic West Bengal. However, multiple low-pressure areas developed over the Bay of Bengal, with Cyclonic Storm Kyant forming in October and Cyclonic Storm Nada in November. Due to the presence of warm sea surface temperatures, Very Severe Cyclone Vardah formed in December.

Systems

Cyclonic Storm Roanu

Under the influence of a trough, a low-pressure area formed over the Bay of Bengal on 14 May. It slowly consolidated, prompting the IMD to classify it as a depression on 17 May. By the late hours of 17 May, a Tropical Cyclone Formation Alert (TCFA) was issued, following which, the JTWC upgraded the system to tropical storm intensity. The next day, the IMD upgraded the storm to a deep depression, prompting the issuance of cyclone warnings for the states of Andhra Pradesh and Odisha. On 19 May, the IMD reported that the storm had reached cyclonic storm intensity, naming it Roanu. The cyclone drifted in a northeastward track, and continued to intensify until persistent wind shear and its proximity to land eventually caused the storm to start weakening, on the same day. However, the wind shear soon decreased, and Roanu reintensified as deep convection became established over and around the low-level circulation center (LLCC). Moving generally east-northeastwards, the storm made landfall just northwest of Chittagong, Bangladesh on 21 May, upon which it rapidly weakened.

Depression ARB 01

Land Depression 01

On 6 July, a depression formed over north central India. The Land Depression dissipated on the next day.

Land Depression 02

A well-marked low-pressure area developed into a depression on 9 August, close to Canning, West Bengal, India. The deep depression moved towards Jharkhand on 11 August, and quickly weakened into a depression. On 12 August, the land depression degenerated into a well-marked low.

Eight trawlers with a collective 118 fishermen aboard went missing over the Bay of Bengal during the storm; at least 2 people are feared dead. The Indian Coast Guard launched a large-scale search and rescue operation to locate the missing fishermen. All of the trawlers later returned to port, with one requiring assistance due to engine failure.

Deep Depression BOB 02

A low-pressure area formed over the Bay of Bengal in mid-August 2016. It slowly consolidated, prompting the IMD to upgrade the system to a Depression on 16 August. 

The system brought heavy rainfall to the eastern states of India, a region which was experiencing deficient monsoon rains. Heavy rains fell in West Bengal, including Kolkata, which recorded winds of 70 km/h. At least 6 people died in Kolkata, directly due to the storm. In Jharkhand, two teams of the National Disaster Response Force were deployed in the Garhwa and Chatra districts of the state, amid concerns of a possible flash flood.

Cyclonic Storm Kyant

An area of low pressure formed over east-central Bay of Bengal on 19 October. It slowly consolidated and was upgraded to a Depression on 21 October. The system tracked over a marginally favorable environment, and intensified into a deep depression on 23 October. This was soon followed by the JTWC issuing a Tropical Cyclone Formation Alert (TCFA) for the system. On 24 October, both the IMD and JTWC reported that the storm had reached tropical cyclone strength, with the IMD naming it Kyant. Initially following a northeastward path, the storm re-curved westward off the coast of Myanmar, along the southern periphery of a subtropical ridge, towards the eastern coast of India.  The JTWC issued its final warning at 21:00 UTC on 26 October, and Kyant was last noted as a well-marked low-pressure area off the coast of southern Andhra Pradesh, early on 28 October.

Depression BOB 04

An area of convection persisted in the Gulf of Thailand on 31 October. Over the next few days, the storm crossed the Malay Peninsula and drifted northwestward into the Bay of Bengal, as it steadily organized. Being located in a highly favorable environment, the system rapidly consolidated, which inclined the JTWC to issue a TCFA on 2 November. The IMD reported that the area of low pressure had organized into a Depression by the next day. However, the storm moved into an area of very high wind shear, prompting the JTWC to cancel the TCFA on 4 November. The system gradually weakened as it tracked along the eastern coast of India over the next two days, and dissipated near southeast Bangladesh on 6 November. Around this time, the weakened system triggered heavy rainfall in the coastal areas of West Bengal and Bangladesh, killing 80 people directly.

Cyclonic Storm Nada

In the wake of Nada, the schools in Tamil Nadu declared a two-day holiday, in order to be available as cyclone shelters. Heavy rainfall lashed southern India and Sri Lanka. Mamallapuram in Tamil Nadu recorded  rainfall within 24 hours on 2 December. Jaffna, Sri Lanka also reported  of rainfall.

Very Severe Cyclonic Storm Vardah

Under the influence of a persistent area of convection, a low-pressure area formed over the Malay Peninsula, adjoining north Sumatra, in early December 2016. The low-pressure area developed as a tropical disturbance over the next several days, as it slowly moved towards the southeast Bay of Bengal. Owing to low wind shear and favorable sea surface temperatures, the storm intensified into a deep depression on the following day. Skirting off the Andaman and Nicobar Islands as a deep depression, BOB 06 was upgraded to a cyclonic storm by the IMD and JTWC, in the early hours of 8 December, and was assigned the name Vardah by the IMD.

With conditions favorable for further development, Vardah intensified into a severe cyclonic storm on 9 December. Although predicted to maintain its intensity, Vardah strengthened further, as it followed a generally west-northwestward track, prompting the IMD to upgrade its intensity to very severe cyclonic storm status, on 10 December. On 12 December, Vardah made landfall in southern India and weakened rapidly, before weakening into a remnant low on 13 December. On 14 December, the remnants of Cyclone Vardah crossed the Indian Subcontinent and entered the Arabian Sea on 14 December. Owing to warm sea surface temperatures, the system regenerated into a depression on 17 December, with the IMD assigning the storm a new identifier, ARB 02.

Vardah brought heavy rainfall to Andaman and Nicobar Islands as a deep depression. Hut Bay recorded  of rainfall on 6 December, while Port Blair recorded  of rainfall on 7 December. More than 1,400 tourists were stranded on the Havelock and Neil islands of the archipelago.
The cyclone prompted India's largest evacuation in 2 years, with 16,000 people evacuated. 24 deaths related to the cyclone were reported in the State of Tamil Nadu.

Depression ARB 02

The remnants of Cyclone Vardah crossed the Indian Subcontinent and entered the Arabian Sea on 14 December. Owing to warm sea surface temperatures, the system regenerated into a depression on 17 December, with the IMD assigning the storm a new identifier, ARB 02. On the next day, the system entered an area marked by colder sea surface temperatures and high wind shear, causing it to rapidly weaken into a well-marked low-pressure area, just off the coast of Somalia.

Storm names

Season effects
This is a table of all storms in the 2016 North Indian Ocean cyclone season. It mentions all of the season's storms and their names, duration, peak intensities (according to the IMD storm scale), damage, and death totals. Damage and death totals include the damage and deaths caused when that storm was a precursor wave or extratropical low, and all of the damage figures are in 2016 USD.

|-
| Roanu ||  || bgcolor=#| || bgcolor=#| || bgcolor=#| || Sri Lanka, East coast of India, Bangladesh, Myanmar, Yunnan ||  ||  || 
|-
| ARB 01 ||  || bgcolor=#| || bgcolor=#| || bgcolor=#| || Oman, Gujarat || None || None ||
|-
| LAND 01 ||  || bgcolor=#| || bgcolor=#| || bgcolor=#| || East India || Unknown || None ||
|-
| LAND 02 ||  || bgcolor=#| || bgcolor=#| || bgcolor=#| || East India, Bangladesh || Minimal || 20 ||
|-
| BOB 02 ||  || bgcolor=#| || bgcolor=#| || bgcolor=#| || East India, Bangladesh || Unknown || 17 ||
|-
| Kyant ||  || bgcolor=#| || bgcolor=#| || bgcolor=#| || Andaman Islands, Myanmar, South India || None ||  None ||
|-
| BOB 04 ||  || bgcolor=#| || bgcolor=#| || bgcolor=#| || Malaysia, Thailand, West Bengal, Bangladesh || Unknown || 80 ||
|-
| Nada ||  || bgcolor=#| || bgcolor=#| || bgcolor=#| || Sri Lanka, South India || Unknown || 12 ||
|-
| Vardah ||  || bgcolor=#| || bgcolor=#| || bgcolor=#| || Sumatra, Andaman and Nicobar Islands, Thailand, Malaysia, Sri Lanka, Chennai (Tamil Nadu) ||  || 47 ||
|-
| ARB 02 ||  || bgcolor=#| || bgcolor=#| || bgcolor=#| || Somalia || Unknown || None ||
|-

See also

 Weather of 2016
 Tropical cyclones in 2016
 2016 Atlantic hurricane season
 2016 Pacific hurricane season
 2016 Pacific typhoon season
South-West Indian Ocean cyclone seasons: 2015–16, 2016–17
Australian region cyclone seasons: 2015–16, 2016–17
South Pacific cyclone seasons: 2015–16, 2016–17
 South Atlantic tropical cyclone

References

External links
India Meteorological Department
Joint Typhoon Warning Center

 
Articles which contain graphical timelines
2016 NIO